Mohammad-Hossein Khoshvaght was head of the press and foreign journalists department at Iran's Ministry of Culture and Islamic Guidance, under reformist President Mohammad Khatami.

Background
A relative by marriage to Supreme Leader Ayatollah Ali Khamenei, he is a former Rome bureau chief of the Islamic Republic News Agency, fluent in Italian and English. He came into news during the alleged murder of Iranian-Canadian photojournalist Zahra Kazemi by official security forces, as he claimed he was repeatedly forced by Saeed Mortazavi to declare false information to obstruct the investigation into Kazemi’s death.

References and notes

Iranian politicians
Iranian journalists
Living people
Year of birth missing (living people)